Jamil Jean-Jacques (born February 10, 1975) is a Haitian footballer (defender) playing currently for USL First Division side Miami FC.

Club career
Jean-Jacques started his career at Racing Club Haïtien and only moved abroad to Miami FC at age 31. Jamil currently plays for Palmeiras FC of the Florida Elite Soccer League, FESL.

International career
He made his debut for Haiti in a March 2000 friendly match against El Salvador, but he has not been a regular member of the national team, though, since he only collected a mere 12 caps. He did play in the September 2006 CONCACAF Gold Cup qualifying matches. He then was a squad member at the 2007 Gold Cup Finals but only played one game, coming on as a substitute against Canada.

Honours
 Caribbean Nations Cup 2006-07 (1) : 2007

External links
 Player profile - Miami FC club website

References

1975 births
Living people
Haitian footballers
Miami FC (2006) players
USL First Division players
Haiti international footballers
Association football defenders